Cuero is one of eleven parishes  in Candamo, a municipality within the province and autonomous community of Asturias, in northern Spain. 

Villages
 Cuero
 El Campillín
 El Puente Peñaflor

Parishes in Candamo